Maurice "Moe" Irvin is an American television and film actor best known for his role as Nurse Tyler Christian in the television medical drama Grey's Anatomy.

Aside from his recurring role in Grey's Anatomy, he has had minor appearances in the programs Alias, In Justice and V.I.P., and in the films Killer Weekend, The Human Quality, Con Games, The Helix... Loaded, Hush: A Film by Eva Minemar, Bulldog and Shakedown.

Additionally, he appeared on stage in "Our Lady of 121st Street" premier in L.A. 2006–7.

Filmography

Film

Television

External links 
 

American male television actors
American male film actors
Living people
Year of birth missing (living people)